B. nana may refer to:

 Banksia nana, the dwarf dryandra, a shrub species 
 Bantia nana, a praying mantis species
 Barygenys nana, a frog species endemic to Papua New Guinea
 Betula nana, the dwarf birch, a tree species 
 Billbergia nana, a plant species endemic to Brazil 
 Boswellia nana, a plant species endemic to Yemen 's Soqotra Island
 Brachyphylla nana, the Cuban fruit-eating bat, a bat species found in Bahamas, Cayman Islands, Cuba, the Dominican Republic, Haiti, Jamaica, and Turks and Caicos Islands
 Brookesia nana, an extremely small species of chameleon, endemic to montane rainforest in northern Madagascar

See also
 Nana (disambiguation)